Itchōme may refer to various train stations in Japan:

Aoyama-itchōme Station
Asahimachi-itchōme Station
Chiyorichō-itchōme Station
Ginza-itchōme Station
Kamimachi-itchōme Station
Nagamachi-Itchōme Station
Roppongi-itchōme Station
Sanbashi-dōri-itchōme Station